Nic Endo (born January 7, 1976) is a Japanese-German-American noise musician who plays with the German digital hardcore group Atari Teenage Riot. The daughter of a Japanese mother and a German father, Endo was born in Wichita Falls, Texas, US.

Background
Endo lived in Frankfurt from 1994 to 1996 and later moved to Berlin. Nic Endo joined ATR while they were on tour in 1997 and was involved with the production of their final album 60 Second Wipe Out.

After ATR effectively broke up in 2000, Endo released an experimental solo album entitled Cold Metal Perfection. Released by Fatal Recordings, an explicitly feminist offshoot of Digital Hardcore Recordings, Cold Metal Perfection was named as one of the top 20 albums of 2001 by Alternative Press.

In 2001, Endo assisted in the production of Alec Empire's solo album, Intelligence and Sacrifice. She has also since been a part of Empire's touring band, and was also involved with his follow-up album Futurist (2005). In 2010 ATR reformed and Endo has taken Hanin Elias's slot as the female vocalist in ATR. Her trademark style is her black leather and white face paint overlaid by the characters 抵抗, meaning "resistance".

Influences 
Endo has spoken about her appreciation for Alice Coltrane, James Chance, Miles Davis, Jimi Hendrix, Destroy All Monsters, Freddie Hubbard, Led Zeppelin, Maya Deren, John Coltrane, Brainticket, the Velvet Underground, the Doors, Neu!, and Sun Ra.

Discography
 White Heat (EP) (DHR 1998)
 Poison Lips (as She Satellites) (Geist 1998)
 Cold Metal Perfection (DHR Fatal 2001)

References

External links
Nic Endo
Nic Endo biography at DigitalHardcore.com
Nic Endo on Myspace

1976 births
American electronic musicians
German industrial musicians
People from Wichita Falls, Texas
Musicians from Berlin
Musicians from Frankfurt
Living people
American industrial musicians
American musicians of Japanese descent
American people of German descent
American women in electronic music
Atari Teenage Riot members
21st-century American women